Igor Bobko (born 9 September 1985) is a Belarusian professional footballer who plays for Baranovichi.

References

External links

Profile at teams.by

1985 births
Living people
People from Baranavichy
Sportspeople from Brest Region
Belarusian footballers
Association football defenders
FC Kobrin players
FC SKVICH Minsk players
FC PMC Postavy players
FC Gorodeya players
FC Slutsk players
FC Baranovichi players